Stuart Darren Thomas (born 25 January 1975) is a former Welsh cricketer. He is a left-handed batsman and a right-arm medium-pace bowler.

Having first achieved notability taking a five-wicket haul against Derbyshire at the age of 17, Thomas took his chance at a place in the England youth team, and continued to bowl well through to 1995, at which point he suffered a dip in form which lasted until he regained his form in 1998, finishing top of the wicket-taking stakes with 81 wickets at an average of 24. He bowled an innings of 7 for 16, a record for Glamorgan, and was offered a chance to play for England A against South Africa and Zimbabwe.

Thomas was part of the Glamorgan side which won the county's first County Championship in 28 years in 1997, taking 44 wickets at 26.36, including 5 for 38 in the fixture against Somerset which clinched the title.

He became the leading wicket taker in 2000 and recorded his first ten-wicket haul in a match against Durham in 2002.

In 2007, after fifteen years with Glamorgan, he joined Essex County Cricket Club. However, a shoulder injury sustained in February of that year prevented his playing even once for the first team, and in September he announced his retirement.

Notes

1975 births
Living people
Welsh cricketers
Glamorgan cricketers
Cricketers from Swansea
NBC Denis Compton Award recipients
Wales National County cricketers
Wales National County cricket captains